Morad Daoud is a Syrian writer and sculptor(born 2 August 1960, Salamyieh) Member of the story and novels society in the Arab Writers Union. He obtained a vocational secondary certificate in the competence of industrial electricity and worked as a staff member of the Defense Industries Corporation until his retirement in 2011, where he completed his literary work and sculpture, married and has three sons.

He finished writing his first novel (A Confession of an important man) in 2005, but did not publish it until 2008. After that, in early 2010, he published two novels, "The Hasty" and "The Dreams Continue."

In 2011 a new police novel of Daoud's published under the name "Folding claws", In 2014 he finished his story collection (al-Ghawader) and the novel "Half-Night tales".

His dream was renewed in the novel (and dreams continue) and extended to  the form of (A Confession of an important man), and then focused his attention on those who carried treachery in their fold,  monitoring  cases of treachery through his novel (al-Ghawaderr), at the same time Threatening he will fold their claws in his new novel, saying: There are those who do not lose sight of their intrigues.

Finally said: (coming from history) to tell what happened through the notes of a louse which visited the heads of several of them and encountered in the trail, and was punctuated by some stories during a session of serenity with those we love late night "Half-Night tales". As well as those greetings to Aleppo steadfast with sculptures of life wood

Exhibitions 

Participated in several art exhibitions through wood sculptures :

Exhibition "Greetings to Munther Shehawi" held at the Friends of Salamyieh Society.
"Toward Aleppo" exhibition, at the Cultural Center in Salmiya.

References 

Syrian novelists
1960 births
Syrian sculptors
Living people
21st-century Syrian artists
21st-century Syrian writers
20th-century Syrian artists
20th-century Syrian writers